The Porticus Octaviae (Portico of Octavia) is an ancient structure in Rome. The colonnaded walks of the portico enclosed the temples of Jupiter Stator and Juno Regina, as well as a library. The structure was used as a fish market from the medieval period up to the end of 19th century.

History

The structure was built by Augustus in the name of his sister, Octavia Minor, sometime after 27 BC, in place of the Porticus Metelli.  The colonnaded walks of the portico enclosed the temples of Jupiter Stator and Juno Regina, next to the Theater of Marcellus.  It burned in 80 AD and was restored, probably by Domitian, and again after a second fire in 203 AD by Septimius Severus and Caracalla.  It was adorned with foreign marble and contained many famous works of art, enumerated in Pliny's Natural History.  The structure was damaged by an earthquake in 442 AD, when two of the destroyed columns were replaced with an archway which still stands. A  church was built in the ruins circa 770 AD.

Besides the pre-existing temples, the enclosure included a library erected by Octavia in memory of her son Marcus Claudius Marcellus, the curia Octaviae, and scholae (an assembly hall and lecture rooms). Whether these were different parts of one building, or entirely different structures, is uncertain. It was probably in the curia that the Senate is recorded as meeting. The whole is referred to by Pliny the Elder as Octaviae opera.

The portico's role as a fish market is remembered in the name of the annexed church of Sant'Angelo in Pescheria (Italian: "the Holy Angel in the Fish Market").

The building, which lies in rione Sant'Angelo, represents the center of the Roman Ghetto.

See also
 List of ancient monuments in Rome
 Porticus of Livia
 Porticus Vipsania

References

External links

 LacusCurtius.com: Samuel Ball Platner, revised by Thomas Ashby, A Topographical Dictionary of Ancient Rome: Porticus Octaviae
 The Portico of Octavia (etching by Giovanni Battista Piranesi) at the Metropolitan Museum of Art (New York City)

Buildings and structures completed in the 1st century BC
Ancient Roman buildings and structures in Rome
Augustan building projects
Colonnades
Rome R. XI Sant'Angelo
Jewish Roman (city) history
Octavia the Younger